Pooch is a  colloquial term for a dog.

Pooch also refers to:

People 

 William F. Donovan (1865-1928), Harvard University track and football coach
 Pooch Hall (born 1977), American actor, rapper and model
 Pooch, Arthur Paul Tavares (born 1942), a member of Tavares, an American R&B, funk and soul music group

In arts and entertainment 

 Pooch the Pup, an anthropomorphic dog by Walter Lantz
 Satchel Pooch, a character in the comic Get Fuzzy
 The Pooch, a 1932 Our Gang short

Other uses 

 Project POOCH, a rehabilitation program pairing dogs with incarcerated juveniles
 A nickname for the GE P30CH locomotive
Slang for a big belly

See also
 Pooch punt, a kick in American football
 Poochie (disambiguation)
 Ponch (disambiguation)